The Mossul bleak (Alburnus mossulensis) is a species of ray-finned fish in the genus Alburnus. However, a recent study found that Alburnus mossulensis was probably a synonym of Alburnus sellal.

References

mossulensis
Fish described in 1843